Let It All Begin is the first solo release by Seattle musician Shawn Smith. It was recorded in Seattle and Atlanta. The album was re-released in 2003 by the Establishment Store label and again in 2008 on Sound vs Silence.

For detailed info on each version of this release, see Shawn Smith's Official Website

Track listing
"My Very Best"
"Someday"
"Land of Gold"
"Love Is Always (in your eyes)"
"Until the End"
"Let It All Begin"
"The Train Is Coming"
"Our Songs"
"Pearl"
"On the Banks"

1999 albums
Shawn Smith albums